Jody Arnol (born 25 September 1968) is a former Australian rules football player who played for St Kilda in the Australian Football League during the 1990 and 1991 AFL seasons.

Arnol was the third selection in the 1989 VFL Draft.

References

External links
 
 

1968 births
Australian rules footballers from Tasmania
St Kilda Football Club players
North Hobart Football Club players
Living people
Sturt Football Club players